Shrek: Treasure Hunt is a 2002 party video game developed by The Code Monkeys and published by TDK Mediactive under their TDK Impulse label for the PlayStation. It is the only Shrek game released for the PlayStation. Digital Illusions were going to develop the game, but switched focus to Shrek Extra Large.

Gameplay
Shrek: Treasure Hunt is a party video game in which players control Shrek on collecting items for the picnic, they will have to go through minigames and challenges, in order to complete the level and receive items. Minigames can be assessed by collecting the required amount of items throughout each platforming stage. Collectables can be found.

Plot
As Shrek is preparing a picnic with Fiona, the three blind mice steal all the picnic equipment such as food and drinks, so Shrek must go on an adventure doing minigames to get the items back before Fiona arrives.

Reception
Shrek: Treasure Hunt received a negative response from critics upon release. GameRankings, an aggregator for game reviews, assigned the game a score of 29% based on one review.

References

2002 video games
Party video games
PlayStation (console) games
PlayStation (console)-only games
Shrek video games
Video games developed in the United Kingdom
TDK Mediactive games
3D platform games
Video games with 2.5D graphics